Niels Poul "Tist" Nielsen (25 December 1891 – 9 August 1962) was a Danish footballer who is the joint all-time best goalscorer for the Denmark national team with 52 goals in 38 matches.

Nielsen won a silver medal with the national team at the 1912 Summer Olympics. He played his career as a striker for Kjøbenhavns Boldklub, with whom he won six Danish football championships. In Canada, he played for CNR Montréal, winning the Dominion of Canada Championship in 1929.

Biography 
As a young boy, Nielsen would sneak in to watch football games without paying, thus becoming a gratist (free rider), abbreviated to "Tist". Born in Copenhagen, Nielsen started playing football with Kjøbenhavns Boldklub (KB), where he spent his entire senior career. He made his debut for the Denmark national team on 5 May 1910 as the then youngest player, at 18 years and 131 days of age (exceeding Vilhelm Wolfhagen's age record from 1908). Nielsen's record would remain for eight years, until the 18 years and 51 days old Valdemar Laursen became the youngest Denmark national team debutant.

Nielsen made his debut in a Denmark national team that was playing its first game since winning silver medals at the 1908 Summer Olympics, and he was included in the Danish squad for the 1912 Summer Olympics tournament. He played one game at the 1912 Olympics, the 4–1 win against the Netherlands, where he scored his first national team goal in his third national team game. Denmark later successfully defended their Olympic silver medal, losing 2–4 to Great Britain in the final game, without Nielsen in the team. After the 1912 Olympics, Nielsen started scoring goals for the Denmark national team at a record-setting pace, while guiding KB to two Danish championships in a row during 1913 and 1914. He scored 22 goals in his first nine national team games after the 1912 Olympics, from May 1913 to June 1916, including six goals in a 10–0 win against Sweden and all four Danish goals in a 4–1 win against Germany. His tally in June 1916 was 23 goals in 12 national team games.

He was a part of the KB team that won the 1917, 1918, 1922 and 1925 Danish championships, while still scoring plenty of goals for the Denmark national team. On 14 October 1923, Nielsen broke Sophus Hansen's record from 1920, becoming became the first Dane to play 32 international games. He ended his national team career in September 1925, having scored a total 52 goals in 38 matches, including 26 goals against Norway and 15 goals against Sweden. Although Nielsen played during the 1910s and 1920s, the number of goals he scored for his country is still the national record, and was not equalled until Jon Dahl Tomasson scored his 52nd goal in June 2010. Nielsen's tally of 38 international matches was another Danish record, but it was exceeded by Michael Rohde in June 1931. Because his career spanned the nascent years of international football, Nielsen never got a chance to play in the World Cup; his only world game was the 1912 Summer Olympics. However, Nielsen managed to score eight hat-tricks in his international career.

Nielsen died in Copenhagen in August 1962, aged 70.

Career statistics

International 

Sources:

Honours 
KB
 Danish championship: 1912–13, 1913–14, 1916–17, 1917–18, 1921–22, 1924–25

See also 
 List of top international men's football goalscorers by country
 List of men's footballers with 50 or more international goals

References

External links 
 Danish national team profile
 Haslund profile 
 Peders Fodboldstatistik profile 

Danish men's footballers
Kjøbenhavns Boldklub players
Denmark international footballers
Footballers at the 1912 Summer Olympics
Olympic silver medalists for Denmark
Olympic footballers of Denmark
1891 births
1962 deaths
Olympic medalists in football
Medalists at the 1912 Summer Olympics
Association football forwards
Footballers from Copenhagen